Night, Silence, Desert is a collaborative album by Iranian musician Kayhan Kalhor with Mohammad Reza Shajarian and others, released on 12 September 2000 in the United States through Traditional Crossroads records.

Track listing

Personnel
Kayhan Kalhor – Kamancheh 
Mohammad Reza Shajarian – Vocals
Ardavan Kamkar – Santur
Bijan Kamkar – Daf
Behzad Farhoudi – Ney
Hossein Behroozinia – Barbat
Haj Ghorban Soleimani – Dotar

References

Kayhan Kalhor albums
Persian music
Middle Eastern music
2000 albums